= Abnodius =

Ethiopian saint in Coptic Church

Saint
- Venerated in: Coptic Orthodox Church
- Feast: 3 September

Abnodius is a saint of Ethiopia (Abyssinia). He is venerated in the Coptic Church on 3 September.

== Sources ==
- Holweck, F. G. A Biographical Dictionary of the Saints. St. Louis, Missouri, US: B. Herder Book Co. 1924.
